Protest is the second solo album by Bunny Wailer, originally released in 1977 in Jamaica on Solomonic Records and internationally on Island Records.

Track listing 
All songs written by Bunny Wailer except where noted.

Side one 
 "Moses Children" 		
 "Get Up, Stand Up" (Bob Marley, Peter Tosh)	
 "Scheme of Things" 		
 "Quit Trying"

Side two 
 "Follow Fashion Monkey" 		
 "Wanted Children" 		
 "Who Feels It" 		
 "Johnny Too Bad" (Bunny Wailer, Trevor Wilson)

Personnel

Musicians 
The Solomonic Enchanters - backing vocals
Robbie Shakespeare - bass guitar
Leroy "Horsemouth" Wallace, Michael Richards - drums
Earl "Chinna" Smith- guitar
Bobby Ellis, Herman Marquis, Dirty Harry, Tommy McCook - horns
Bernard "Touter" Harvey, Earl "Wire" Lindo, Keith Sterling - keyboards

Production 
 Producer - Bunny Wailer
 Mixing Engineer - Bunny Wailer & Sylvan Morris
 Engineer - Bunny Wailer & Sylvan Morris

References 

1977 albums
Bunny Wailer albums
Island Records albums
Mango Records albums